Petronella ("Petra") Grietje van Staveren (born 2 June 1966) is a former breaststroke swimmer from the Netherlands who won the gold medal in the 100 meter breaststroke at the 1984 Summer Olympics in Los Angeles. She also won a bronze at the 1986 world championships and a European silver in 1983 in the 4×100 meter medley relay. She finished five times in fourth place at European championships in 1981–1985.

References

1966 births
Living people
Olympic swimmers of the Netherlands
Swimmers at the 1984 Summer Olympics
Olympic gold medalists for the Netherlands
People from Kampen, Overijssel
Dutch female breaststroke swimmers
World Aquatics Championships medalists in swimming
European Aquatics Championships medalists in swimming
Knights of the Order of Orange-Nassau

Medalists at the 1984 Summer Olympics
Olympic gold medalists in swimming
Sportspeople from Overijssel